Taman Molek is a town located in Taman Molek Johor Bahru, Johor, Malaysia. It was developed by Pelangi Berhad Group in the 1990s and now become a mini commercial centre with several major bank branches: Standard Chartered, HSBC, Al-Rajhi Bank, Kuwait Finance House, Royal Bank of Scotland, OCBC, UOB, RHB Bank, EON, Maybank, Hwang-DBS Investments, PMB Investment Berhad. It is surrounded by Taman Johor Jaya, Taman Redang, Taman Desa Harmoni, Taman Saujana, Taman Seri Molek Perdana and is adjacent to two major golf courses, Ponderosa Golf and Country Resort and the Daiman 18 Golf and Country Resort. It has become more popular as a commercial and residential area and with a direct link to Johor Bahru slated to open soon. It is also close to the Tebrau-Plentong corridor which is seeing tremendous growth and also many high-end developments such as waterfront and marina type projects along with hotels and more commercial areas set to come in future.

A little known fact about Taman Molek is that for about half century it was the site of the main transmitting station of the BBC or British Broadcasting Corporation in the Far East – known locally as BBC Tebrau – before this was relocated to Singapore. In the old days the Masai Trunk Road was popularly known as the BBC Road.

Education
Sekolah Kebangsaan Taman Molek (SKTM)
Sekolah Menengah Kebangsaan Taman Molek
D'Molek FC
Smart Reader Kids Kindergarten
Cherie Hearts International Pre School
Gem Preschool

Hotels
Aspen Summer Hotel
Grand Hallmark Hotel
Molek Garden Hotel

References

Johor Bahru housing estates
Townships in Johor